Cissus hypoglauca is a common Australian vine. It is one of the better known climbing plants of the genus Cissus in the grape family. A very common climber in moist areas of eastern Australia, it often colonises large areas after forest damage due to storms, fire or logging. Common names include jungle grape, water vine, giant water vine, five-leaf water vine, jungle vine, native grapes and billangai .

It was initially described in 1854 by American botanist Asa Gray.

Description 
Cissus hypoglauca is a large woody vine. The name water-vine comes from the fact that the woody sections of the vine may be cut into sections and the sap that drips from the sections may be drunk as water. The leaves are palmate, and are usually arranged in a group of five. Leaves elliptic or ovate in shape, slightly toothed or entire. Mid green above and a glaucous shade underneath, and measure 3 to 15 cm (1–6 in) long, 1.5 to 4 cm (0.6-1.6 in) wide. The young leaves are reddish and hairy. Tendrils appear opposite the leaf stalk.

Yellow flowers occur on terminal umbels, mostly in spring and summer. A purple globose fruit matures in the middle of the year. Five leaf Water Vine provides abundant food and shelter for birds and small animals. The stunning blue berries may be eaten raw and provide a delicious watery snack but do leave an acrid aftertaste that can be slightly irritating.

Gallery

References

External links

Cissus hypoglauca occurrence data from the Australasian Virtual Herbarium
 Rainforest Climbing Plants - Williams & Harden, 2000 
 Plant Net, Cissus hypoglauca http://plantnet.rbgsyd.nsw.gov.au/cgi-bin/NSWfl.pl?page=nswfl&lvl=sp&name=Cissus~hypoglauca Retrieved 21 August 2009

hypoglauca
Rosids of Australia
Flora of New South Wales
Flora of Queensland
Flora of Victoria (Australia)
Vines